The Department of Industry, Science and Resources was an Australian government department that existed between October 1998 and November 2001.

Scope
Information about the department's functions and/or government funding allocation could be found in the Administrative Arrangements Orders, the annual Portfolio Budget Statements, in the Department's annual reports and on the Department's website.

At its creation, the Department was responsible for the following:
Manufacturing and commerce, including industry and market development
Science, technology and innovation, including industrial research and development 
Mineral and energy industries, including gas and petroleum, and electricity 
Export services 
Energy and resources science and research, including geoscience 
Marketing, including export promotion, of manufactures and service
Investment promotion and facilitation
Enterprise improvement 
Tourism industry 
Construction industry 
Facilitation of the development of service industries generally 
Bounties on the production of goods 
Offsets, to the extent not dealt with by the Department of Defence 
Patents of inventions and designs, and trade marks 
Country of origin labelling 
Weights and measures standards 
Civil space issues 
Analytical laboratory services 
Geodesy, mapping, remote sensing and land information co-ordination 
Ionospheric prediction 
Sport and recreation including industry development 
Radioactive waste management 
Administration of export controls on energy products

Structure
The Department was an Australian Public Service department, staffed by officials who were responsible to the Minister for Industry, Science and Resources, Nick Minchin.

References

Ministries established in 1998
Industry, Science and Resources
1998 establishments in Australia
2001 disestablishments in Australia